Joseph Pepé (5 March 1881 – 29 September 1970) was an English sport shooter who competed in the 1912 Summer Olympics for Great Britain. In 1912 he won the gold medal with the British team in the team 50 metre small-bore rifle competition and the silver medal in the team 25 metre small-bore rifle event. In the 25 metre small-bore rifle competition he finished fourth and in the 50 metre rifle, prone event he finished 14th.

References

External links 
 Joseph Pepé's profile at DatabaseOlympics.com

1881 births
1970 deaths
British male sport shooters
ISSF rifle shooters
Olympic shooters of Great Britain
Shooters at the 1912 Summer Olympics
English Olympic medallists
Olympic gold medallists for Great Britain
Olympic silver medallists for Great Britain
Olympic medalists in shooting
Medalists at the 1912 Summer Olympics